Cha Seung-woo (born July 27, 1978), better known as Cha Cha, is a South Korean singer and actor. Cha was a member of punk band No Brain.

Filmography

Awards and nominations

References

External links 
 
 

1978 births
Living people
South Korean male film actors
21st-century South Korean  male singers